Michael Groce is a poet, community worker and former criminal.  His mother, Cherry Groce, was shot and paralysed by police during a dawn raid on her home, starting the 1985 Brixton riot in London, England.  He is now a published poet, having won the Cheltenham Poetry Prize, and actively engages with young people to inform them of his own experiences.

Early biography

Michael Groce was brought up in Tinworth House, on a rough housing estate in Vauxhall, London.  Much of his life from age six was spent in residential care.  He was involved with street gangs, and had been exposed to guns during his childhood.  He spent time in and out of prison; throughout his life, he accrued 50 convictions and 15 different spells in prison.

Role in the riots
A few days before the riots, Michael Groce was involved in a domestic dispute with his girlfriend during which he fired a gun. Shortly afterwards, he heard a knocking on the door, and went down to answer it, believing it to be a neighbour complaining about the gunshot.  Instead, he found a police officer, enquiring if he was Michael Groce.  Groce attempted to close the door, but the police officer would not let him, and only left after Groce put the gun into the officer's mouth.

Following this incident, Groce fled his mother's house, and took up residence with his sister.  After three days of hiding, when he turned on the television, he was presented with a picture of his mother accompanying a news story about her shooting and subsequent paralysis from the waist down.  She had been shot in a police raid in search of him.

Her shooting triggered the riots.  Groce handed himself in to the police shortly afterwards.

Community work
Following the riots, Michael Groce attempted to help the community recover - he ran a youth football team, trying to provide a fun alternative to crime.

He now runs poetry, personal development and motivational workshops in schools, and gives talks to dissuade others from making mistakes similar to those he made.

Political activity 
In May 2018, Groce ran as the Green Party candidate in the Lambeth Council Elections where he stood in the Coldharbour ward. He polled 761 votes (15.3%) finishing the runner up in fourth place out of thirteen candidates.

Later that year, Groce was selected as the Green candidate for the Coldharbour by-election where he again finished in second place with 31% of the vote (912 votes), with an increase of almost 16%.

Poetry
Groce is also a poet.  He wrote poetry in prison, often at the request of other inmates to send in letters to partners or family. He won the Cheltenham Festivals, and owns his own performance club.

References

20th-century births
Living people
20th-century English criminals
Criminals from London
Date of birth missing (living people)
People from Lambeth
Place of birth missing (living people)
English male poets
Year of birth missing (living people)
English people of Jamaican descent
Black British writers